2829 Bobhope is a dark asteroid of the Meliboea family, from the outer region of the asteroid belt. It was discovered on 9 August 1948, by South African astronomer Ernest Leonard Johnson at Union Observatory in Johannesburg. The asteroid was later named after comedian Bob Hope.

Orbit and classification 

Bobhope is a member of the Meliboea family, a smaller asteroid family of carbonaceous outer-belt asteroids with a few hundred members, named after 137 Meliboea. It orbits the Sun in the outer main-belt at a distance of 2.5–3.7 AU once every 5 years and 5 months (1,985 days). Its orbit has an eccentricity of 0.19 and an inclination of 14° with respect to the ecliptic.

Naming 

This minor planet was named for English-born, American comedian Bob Hope (1903–2003), star of innumerable feature film, theater, TV and radio productions, and known for the horror comedy Cat and the Canary (1939). He hosted the Academy Awards more than any other host, and received several Honorary and Special Oscars himself. Hope also received more than forty honorary doctorates. The  was published by the Minor Planet Center on 1 September 1993.

Physical characteristics 

Bobhope has been characterized as a carbonaceous C-type asteroid, which agrees with the overall spectral type of the Meliboea family.

Rotation period 

A rotational lightcurve of Bobhope was obtained from photometric observations by astronomer Landy Carbo at Oakley Southern Sky Observatory , Australia, and at the U.S. Oakley Observatory in September 2008. It gave it a rotation period of  hours with a brightness variation of  magnitude. A previously published lightcurve by French amateur astronomer Bernard Christophe gave a somewhat longer period of  hours with an amplitude of 0.50.

Diameter and albedo 

According to the surveys carried out by the Infrared Astronomical Satellite IRAS, the Japanese Akari satellite, and NASA's Wide-field Infrared Survey Explorer with its subsequent NEOWISE mission, Bobhope measures between 32.14 and 40.98 kilometers in diameter and its surface has an albedo between 0.05 and 0.0916. More dated NEOWISE publications gave a larger diameter of 41.361 and 44.8 kilometers, respectively. The Collaborative Asteroid Lightcurve Link derives an albedo of 0.0586 and a diameter of 38.0 kilometers with an absolute magnitude of 10.8.

References

External links 
 Lightcurve Database Query (LCDB), at www.minorplanet.info
 Dictionary of Minor Planet Names, Google books
 Asteroids and comets rotation curves, CdR – Geneva Observatory, Raoul Behrend
 Discovery Circumstances: Numbered Minor Planets (1)-(5000) – Minor Planet Center
 
 

002829
Discoveries by Ernest Leonard Johnson
Named minor planets
19480809
Bob Hope